The Tamil Eelam national cricket team is the national team of Tamil Eelam. The team, which consists of semi-professional and amateur players drawn from the Sri Lankan Tamil diaspora community in various countries. Tamil Eelam is not affiliated with ICC and therefore cannot compete for the ICC Cricket World Cup. The team plays in various tournaments such as the 'Last Man Stands'.

In the 'Last Man Stands' tournament, the team has played 15 games and won 12 and lost 3. The winning ratio of the team is 80%.

Tamil Eelam team squad for Last Man Stands Australia Open 2015

 Kapilthev Thevarasa (c)
 Mohan Kanthanathan
 Soba Mahes
 Bill Clinton Murfin
 Prashanth Velayutham
 Kopi Parameswaran
 Sutharsan Kanthanathan
 Nitharsan Ariyarathnam

See also
 Transnational Government of Tamil Eelam
 Tamil Eelam national football team

References

External links
 Tamil Eelam cricket team statistics on LastManStands

Tamil Eelam